The Songs of Kurt Cobain is a 5-disc CD box set of music by the American rock band Nirvana, released as a promo only in 2007. The first three CDs feature songs by Nirvana themselves, while the last two discs feature covers by 11 other artists as well as seven "lullaby" and six "string" renditions of the band's songs.

Release

The Songs of Kurt Cobain was released by Primary Wave, who had acquired the rights to the Nirvana frontman's compositions from his widow Courtney Love in early 2007 for the purpose of promoting interest in licensing his work. The cover versions were recorded by artists such as Sinéad O'Connor ("All Apologies") and Tori Amos ("Smells Like Teen Spirit").  Scala & Kolacny Brothers' cover of "Smells Like Teen Spirit" was later used in the documentary Kurt Cobain: Montage of Heck in 2015.

The release is highly valued by collectors, having been limited to a run of 500 copies.

Packaging

Each CD in the box set has a custom-printed picture and they are housed in a heart-shaped, hand-carved wooden musical box with Kurt Cobain's caricature logo etched on the lid and Primary Wave's logo on the side. When the lid is removed it plays the intro bars of the Nirvana song "Heart-Shaped Box". Each box set also comes with a booklet and individually numbered certificate.

Reception

Despite having become a sought-after collector's item, Tiny Mix Tapes gave the release a poor review in November 2007. WorthPoint, however, stated that the release was "the best collection of singer/songwriter Kurt Cobain's music available".

Track listings

CD 1

CD 2

CD 3

CD 4

CD 5

References

Nirvana (band) compilation albums
2007 compilation albums
Primary Wave (company) compilation albums